Sweet briar or Sweetbriar, may refer to:

Buildings 
 Sweet Briar (Geneseo, New York), a historic farm house
 Sweetbriar Hall, a 15th-century mansion in Nantwich, Cheshire, England
 Sweetbriar, a late 18th-century mansion in Philadelphia, Pennsylvania

Other uses 
 Sweetbriar (horse), a racehorse
 Bebe Sweetbriar (born 1962), American drag singer and activist
 , several ships of the Royal Navy
 Rosa rubiginosa, the sweetbriar rose
 Sweet Briar, Virginia, an unincorporated community
 Sweet Briar College, a liberal arts women's college in Sweet Briar, Virginia